The United Kingdom competed at the first Junior Eurovision Song Contest in 2003. A national final was held by Independent Television (ITV) to select the first UK entry to Junior Eurovision.

Before Junior Eurovision

National final 
The final was held on 6 September 2003 in Manchester, and was broadcast on ITV1. The show was presented by Mark Durden-Smith and Tara Palmer-Tomkinson, and regional televoting groups selected the winner from the eight competing acts.

At Junior Eurovision
On the night of the contest, held in Copenhagen, Denmark, Tom Morley performed 12th in the running order of the contest, following Belgium and preceding Denmark. At the close of the voting Morley has received 118 points, placing 3rd of the 16 competing entries, beaten by Spain and winners' Croatia.

In the United Kingdom, the show was televised on ITV1 with commentary by national final hosts Durden-Smith and Palmer-Tomkinson. The British spokesperson, who announced the British votes during the final, was national finalist Sasha Stevens. The live broadcast averaged 5 million viewers.

Voting

References

United Kingdom
2003
Junior Eurovision Song Contest
Junior Eurovision Song Contest